"Misty Blue" is a song written by Bob Montgomery and made popular by Dorothy Moore.

Misty Blue may also refer to:

 Misty Blue (album), a 1968 album by Ella Fitzgerald
 Misty Blue, a 1976 album by Dorothy Moore which contains the title track hit version
 Misty Blue (video game), a Japan-exclusive video game published by Enix
 Misty Blue Simmes, an American former professional wrestler